Balrampur district is one of the district of the Indian state of Uttar Pradesh and is a part of Devipatan division as well as the historic Awadh regions. It has been cut from the adjacent district Gonda in 1997. Located on the banks of the West Rapti River. Balrampur is known for the temple of Pateshwari Devi, a Shakti Pitha, and for the ruins of the nearby ancient city of Sravasti, now a pilgrimage site for Buddhists and Jains.

Administration
The creation of Balrampur was done by G.D.No. 1428/1-5/97/172/85-R-5 Lucknow dated 25 May 1997 by the division of District Gonda. Siddharth Nagar, Shrawasti, Gonda District, are situated in the east-west and south sides respectively and Nepal State are Situated in its northern side. The area of the district is 336917 Hectares. In which the agriculture irrigated area is 221432 Hectares. In the north of the district is situated the Shivalics ranges of the Himalayas which is called Tarai Region.

According to Government of India, the district Balrampur is one of the Minority Concentrated Districts on the basis of the 2001 census data on population, socio-economic indicators and basic amenities indicators.

Etymology
The district is named after the erstwhile princely estate (Taluqdari) and its capital, Balrampur. The name of this estate was derived from its founder Balram Das, who founded it in c. 1600 CE.

History

Ancient period
Shravasti was the capital of Uttara (North) Kosala. Towards the Rapti River, a little north of Sahet, lies the ancient city of Mahet.

Gautam Buddha spent 21 rainy season under the sacred Peepal tree. The famous incident of Angulimal happened in the forest of Shravasti, where the dacoit who used to kill people and wear a garland of their fingers, was enlightened by Gautam Buddha.

Medieval period
The area covered by the district was a part of Bahraich Sarkar of Awadh Subah during the Mughal rule. Later, it came under the control of the ruler of Awadh till its annexation in February, 1856 by the British government. British government separated Balrampur from Bahraich and it became a part of Gonda.

British and the post-independence period
During the British rule a commissionary was made for the administration of this area with its headquarters at Gonda and military command at Sakraura Colonelganj. During this period Balrampur was an Estate (Taluqdari) Janwar Rajput State in Utraula tehsil of Gonda district, which consisted 3 tehsils, Gonda Sadar, Tarabganj and Utraula. After independence, Balrampur estate was merged with Utraula tehsil of Gonda district. On 1 July 1953 the tehsil of Utraula was bifurcated into two tehsils, Balrampur and Utraula. In 1987 three new tehsils were created from Gonda Sadar tehsil, namely, Tulsipur, Mankapur and Colonelganj. Later, in 1997 Gonda district was bifurcated into two parts and a new district, Balrampur was born consisting of three tehsils of the northern part of the erstwhile Gonda district, Balrampur, Utraula, and Tulsipur.

Geography
The district's northern border with Nepal's Dang Deukhuri District follows the southern edge of the Dudhwa Range of the Siwaliks. To the northeast lies Kapilvastu District, Nepal. The rest of Balrampur is surrounded by Uttar Pradesh: on the east by Siddarthnagar, Basti on the south, Gonda on the southwest, and Shravasti on the west. Balrampur's area is 3,457 km2.

Economy
Balrampur is known for Balrampur Chini Mills, one of the largest sugar manufacturing industry in the country. In 2006 the Ministry of Panchayati Raj named Balrampur one of the country's 250 most backward villages (out of a total of 640). It is one of the 34 districts in Uttar Pradesh currently receiving funds from the Backward Regions Grant Fund Programme (BRGF).

The district comprises 3 tehsils, Balrampur, Tulsipur and Utraula, which are further divided into 9 blocks: Balrampur, Gaindas bujurg, Gainsari, Harya satgharwa, Pachpedwa, Rehera bazar, Shriduttganj, Tulsipur and Utraula Sadullaah Nagar

Demographics
According to the 2011 census Balrampur district has a population of 2,148,665. This gives it a ranking of 210th in India. Its population growth rate over the decade 2001-2011 was 27.74%. Balrampur has a sex ratio of 922 females for every 1000 males, and a literacy rate of 51.76%. Scheduled Castes and Scheduled Tribes made up 12.90% and 1.16% of the population respectively. The tribals of this district are Tharus.

At the time of the 2011 Census of India, 87.23% of the population in the district spoke Hindi, 8.61% Awadhi and 4.06% Urdu as their first language.

Religion

Balrampur district has a Hindu-majority population, but a significant Muslim minority. Muslims are most concentrated in Utraula tehsil and form a near-majority in urban areas.

The fortified entrance to Mahet is made of mud, constructed in a crescent shape. The Sobhnath temple houses the great Stupas. These Stupas reflect the Buddhist tradition and boast of the history of the monasteries in Balrampur.

Jeetavana monastery, one of the oldest monasteries in the country, is said to be one of the favorite sites of Gautam Buddha. It contains the 12th century inscriptions. There is also a sacred tree of Peepal nearby. It is said that the tree was grown from a sapling from the original Bodhi Tree at Bodh Gaya. Another site of religious importance in the city is Sravasti. It is said that Mahavira Jain, the 24th Tirthankara of Jainism, 'influenced' this place. It houses the Shwetambar temple.

Education
 Starwards Public School & College

Notable people
 Ali Sardar Jafri
 Bekal Utsahi
 Nanaji Deshmukh
 Afroz Ahmad

Media
The popular Hindi dailies such as North India Times, Shri Times, Dainik Hindustan, Dainik Jagran, Amar Ujala, Jansatta are available in district.

English dailies includes The Times of India, Hindustan Times, The Economic Times, The Business Line, The New Indian Express, The Hans India.

Urdu dailies includes Inqalab, Tareeqh, Roznama Rashtriya Sahara and so on.

Villages
 

Jaitapur

References

External links
 http://balrampur.nic.in 
 http://www.globalvipschool.com

Districts of Uttar Pradesh
Populated places established in 1997
Balrampur district, Uttar Pradesh
Minority Concentrated Districts in India